Thompson Pond is a fresh water pond in central Massachusetts, near North Spencer and Paxton. It is part of the Chicopee River Watershed.

Topography
Turkey Hill Brook starts at Turkey Hill Pond, works its way down to Eames Pond (Moore State Park) and eventually joins Caruth Brook to form Thompson Pond. Turkey Hill Brook flows into the Seven Mile River. At one time, this creek had seven dams on it.

Caruth Brook drains huge wetlands to the north and west of Thompson Pond.

Information
Thompson Pond is within the Spencer State Forest reservation.

The Worcester County 4-H Club maintains a summer camp, Camp Marshall, on its shores. Camp Marshall was originally built as a Civilian Conservation Corps Camp in the 1930s. In 1948 the state provided a lease for a residential camp program.

Fishing
Thompson Pond offers good fishing for many warm water fish. A survey conducted in 1994, showed thirteen species including Large and Small-mouth Bass, Chain Pickerel,  Yellow Perch, White Perch, Black Crappie, Bluegill, Pumpkinseed, Brown and Yellow Bullhead, Golden Shiner, and Sucker.

References

Lakes of Worcester County, Massachusetts
Civilian Conservation Corps in Massachusetts
Spencer, Massachusetts
Ponds of Massachusetts